Jamestown Historic District is a national historic district located at Jamestown, Guilford County, North Carolina.  The district encompasses nine contributing buildings in the Quaker community of Jamestown dated to the early-19th century. Located in the district is the separately listed Richard Mendenhall Plantation Buildings. Other notable buildings include the Richard Mendenhall Store, Jamestown Friends' Meeting House, Dr Shubal Coffin's House and Medical School (c. 1812), Dr. Coffin's second house (c. 1855), Harper-Johnson House, Mcinnis House, Joyner House, and Potter Log House.

It was listed on the National Register of Historic Places in 1973.

References

Historic districts on the National Register of Historic Places in North Carolina
Buildings and structures in Guilford County, North Carolina
National Register of Historic Places in Guilford County, North Carolina